Ancylolomia mirabilis is a moth in the family Crambidae. It was described by Wallengren in 1876. It is found in South Africa.

References

Endemic moths of South Africa
Ancylolomia
Moths described in 1876
Moths of Africa